Palestine participated in their maiden AFC Asian Cup, the 2015 tournament, held in Australia. It was the first time Palestine qualified for the Asian Cup, and this performance has been accredited for the rise of Palestine in international arena, and the team is widely seen as the symbol of unity for Palestinians amidst the conflict between Hamas and Fatah over control of Palestinian Authority. Their second competition appearance came in 2019.

Records

*Denotes draws include knockout matches decided on penalty kicks.

By match

Participation

2015 Australia

Group D

Palestine's maiden Asian Cup debut occurred in 2015 when they were grouped with Japan, Iraq and Jordan, and thus it has a significant effect for the Palestinian team. Their opening match, however, was a match against Asian champion Japan, and they lost 0–4. Palestine continued to suffer another loss, 1–5 to Jordan, which Jaka Ihbeisheh scored their first ever goal in the Asian Cup. Palestine ended their campaign by a 0–2 defeat to Iraq, thus ended last with zero point.

2019 UAE

Group B

Palestine will make their second debut in the tournament, having drawn with two Levant rivals, Syria and Jordan, as well as for the second times against another defending champions, Australia. Palestine, on this tournament, had successfully achieved two points for the first time, with two draws against Syria and Jordan, both ended 0–0. However, their encounter against Australia ended with a 0–3 defeat, which mean Palestine obtained two points, but scored no goal in the tournament. This poor performance caused Palestine to be eliminated from the Asian Cup for the second times.

Squads

References

Countries at the AFC Asian Cup